Nott may refer to:

People
Abraham Nott, a United States Representative
Charles Stanley Nott, an author
Charles Cooper Nott (disambiguation), two New York judges
Eliphalet Nott, President of Union College and Rensselaer Polytechnic Institute
Frederick Lancelot Nott, Member of the Queensland Legislative Assembly
George Nott, English rugby player 
John Nott, a politician
Jonathan Nott, a conductor
Josiah C. Nott, a physician
Julian Nott, a film composer
Julian Nott (balloonist) (1944–2019), British-born American balloonist
Kathleen Nott, a writer
Lewis Nott, member of the Australian House of Representatives
Mike Nott, American football player
Peleg Nott (fl. late 18th century), African American leader 
Peter Nott (1933–2018), Bishop of Norwich from 1985 to 1999
Samuel Nott, American missionary to India
Tara Nott - Weightlifter
William Nott, a military leader

Other
Nótt, the personification of night in Norse mythology
Theodore Nott, a character in the Harry Potter book series
Nott Memorial at Union College
Nott the Brave, a goblin rogue in the D&D Web Series Critical Role

See also
 Notts (disambiguation)